Wanted Man is a compilation album from country singer Johnny Cash and was released in 1994. This album contains some popular songs of Cash like "Wanted Man" and "The Night Hank Williams Came to Town"; it also has the remake of the song "Ballad of A Teenage Queen" (from the 1988 album Water from the Wells of Home).

Cash's re-recording of "Wanted Man" was featured in the closing credits of the 1994 western comedy Lightning Jack, starring Paul Hogan and Cuba Gooding Jr.

It should not be confused with Wanted Man, a later collection of hits released by Columbia Records.

Track listing

Charts
Album - (Canada)

References

1994 compilation albums
Johnny Cash compilation albums
Mercury Records compilation albums